The Camden bench is a type of concrete street furniture. It was commissioned by Camden London Borough Council and installed in Camden, London, in 2012. 

It is designed specifically to influence the behaviour of the public by restricting certain uses and behaviours and instead to be usable only as a bench, a principle known as hostile architecture. The bench has been called "the pinnacle of hostile architecture".

Produced by UK company Factory Furniture, the bench is designed to deter use for sleeping, littering, skateboarding, drug dealing, graffiti and theft. It attempts to achieve this primarily through angular surfaces (deterring sleepers and skateboarders), an absence of crevices or hiding places, and non-permeable materials (via a waterproof anti-paint coating). It is not secured to the ground and can be moved by a crane attaching to built-in anchor points. Due to its weight, it is also designed to function as a roadblock.

History 
Municipalities including Camden Town were removing benches from public spaces because they were seen as enabling behaviour considered anti-social, including skateboarding, sleeping, loitering, and criminal behaviour such as drug dealing. Camden London Borough Council commissioned the design of a bench that would discourage such behaviours, and the first Camden benches were installed in 2012.

Rationale 
According to Factory Furniture founder Dean Harvey, the primary purpose of the bench is to influence behaviour by "minimis[ing] the amount of time people spend in an area. With a perched or sloped surface, people can't loiter for too long." One of Factory Furniture's precursor products, the Serpentine Bench, was marketed in the 1990s as being uncomfortable to sleep on.

The designers contend that "Homelessness should never be tolerated in any society and if we start designing in to accommodate homeless then we have totally failed as a society. Proximity to homelessness unfortunately makes us uncomfortable so perhaps it is good that we feel that and recognise homelessness as a problem rather than design to accommodate it."

Criticism
The Camden bench received criticism as being a prime example of a wider trend of urban design that is anti-homeless, known as hostile architecture. Critics claim it is emblematic of a society where freedom in public space has been curtailed and deviance from accepted forms of behaviour has been made impossible. 
The style of the bench can be related to 'Secret city design tricks to manipulate your behaviour', which relates to the idea that things may be designed to encourage a type of behaviour without it being either obvious or ugly. Another common design of this is modest 'pigs ears', which are placed on walls and benches.

Because the design is "defined far more by what it is not than what it is", the bench has been called the "perfect anti-object", a "masterpiece of unpleasant design", and "the pinnacle of hostile architecture". Other recent names have included 'defensive' or 'disciplinary' architecture. These terms describe many sculptures which are designed and attached or installed in public spaces, in an attempt to render them unusable in certain ways by certain people or groups.

As a prime example of urban design and hostile architecture, the co-director of the Centre for Urban Research at the University of York argues that the idea of the implication of spikes and other related architecture are a part of a broader pattern of hostility and indifference based towards social difference and poverty produced within cities. He views these implications as an assault on the poor, and an attempt to displace their distress which the general public seem to agree with. The argument begins by summarising how different processes overlap and come together, such as economic processes which result in creating people to become vulnerable.

Popular criticism focused on subverting restrictions imposed by the bench, such as by attempting to skateboard on it or sleep on it, and allowing its use only as a bench.

Installations 
In addition to Camden the bench has been installed at the 16th and Mission BART plaza in California. A Camden bench has been used as part of an installation artwork by Roger Hiorns. "Feature sites" for introduction of the bench were on Great Queen Street and High Holborn.

Awards 
The design has achieved several awards:
 Keep Britain Tidy "Best practice street cleansing" (2010)
 Design Council "Best practice for reducing crime" (2012)

It has also been accredited as:
 Home Office "PAS68 approved" (a classification for vehicle security barriers) for counter-terrorism use.

Specifications
The technical specifications are:
 Length, 
 Width, 
 Height, 
 Weight, approx. 1,765 kg
 Materials, exposed aggregate concrete with a galvanised steel frame

References

Class discrimination
Discrimination against the homeless
Street furniture
London Borough of Camden
Industrial design
Homelessness
2012 in London
Concrete